Samleren was a Norwegian newspaper, published in Mandal, Norway. It was a continuation of the periodical Den Lille Samler. It was started in 1909 and went defunct in 1960.

References

1909 establishments in Norway
1960 disestablishments in Norway
Defunct newspapers published in Norway
Mandal, Norway
Norwegian-language newspapers
Newspapers established in 1909
Publications disestablished in 1960
Mass media in Vest-Agder